Dineo Ranaka (born 16 December 1983) is a South African radio personality, television presenter, actress, DJ and TV producer.

As radio presenter, she worked for several radio stations; she started her career at 5fm in 2003 presenting The Fanta World Chart Show with Brown Sugar, she then moved to  Yfm, Highveld Stereo,  Metro FM, and Cliff Central, co-hosted   Essential Rush, The Bridge, and Metro fm Top 40. She is the current main anchor of Kaya 959's breakfast show .

She gannerd local attention after her show Dineo Live on Drive on Yfm was a great success, it is her talent combined with her "can-do" attitude that landed her in the driver’s seat as YFM's first female afternoon drive time jock on "Dineo Live on Drive" which she hosted every Monday to Friday from 3pm -6pm.  She  made an on-screen hit  on etv's Club 808.  Dineo also made appearances and starred in  television series and shows  which includes; Real Goboza, Scandal, Gaz'lam, Yim'lo,  Dineo's Diary,  Gomora , All Access Mzansi and MoJa Love's Ishushu. Ranaka also starred as one of the main characters in feature film  Baby Mamas.

Career

Yfm
Dineo became successful in presenting the Breakfast show. It was her rapid success on her Weekend Breakfast Show that made her the perfect candidate to take over from Chilli M's show which aired daily between 15:00 and 18:00 weekdays. Thereafter replacing the popular Vukani "Chilli M" Masinga who left the show. She then proved the critics wrong and in less than a year, grew the stations listener-ship in the 3-6pm time slot to 750 000 from the previous listener-ship of 600 000.

Dineo hosted the "Dineo Live on Drive" show making her YFM's first female afternoon drive time jock and is recond to be the only female afternoon drive time Radio DJ in the country. Due to her shows success she won the favor of clients such as Love Life, Sanlam, Samsung, Motorola, Vodacom, Cadbury and Levis, just to name a few, requesting that she specifically run and drive their on-air campaigns.

Club 808
During 2010 e.tv launched their lifestyle and music entertainment show aimed at the youth called Club 808 "Make Some Noise".

It featured presenters Dineo Ranaka and Mo flava.on August 2010 During August 2010, Club 808 executive producer Zam Nkosi said: "The show will be fresh, very contemporary, fun, flirty and lightly irreverent, with the tongue firmly in cheek. It will certainly not take itself seriously.". The show currently airs on Etv.

Other appearances
In April 2014, she was a roaster at the Comedy Central Africa's Roast of Kenny Kunene.
She has also acted on Hustle a South African TV series on 2016

Vuntures 
In 2019 she announced her new venture as a House and Hip Hop DJ. In 2020 , through her production  company she produced  Mzali Wami, a drama series which aired on  Mzansi Magic and Showmax. She owns  cosmetic range LuvDrBeauty which launched 16 December 2020.

Personal life
Dineo meaning (Gifts) was born in Diepkloof's Chris Hani Baragwanath Hospital, in South Africa. Dineo educated at Unisa. She is the Sister of South African Actress
Manaka Ranaka.

Controversies

2010
In September 2010 Fireworks erupted between singer Kelly Khumalo and Dineo Ranaka during rehearsals for the YFM and Chevrolet Divas party. A source told the Sunday World newspaper that things went wrong after Khumalo arrived at the rehearsals more than two hours late.

It is believed that Khumalo was not prepared for the gig, she was throwing tantrums and not following the brief. The "moo moos" hit the fan when Dineo, asked Khumalo about motherhood. Dineo states that she was sitting down getting ready for the rehearsal while one of her colleagues was interviewing Khumalo for an insert in Club 808 on camera. She says the interview was based on Khumalo's music and she thought it had no depth because Khumalo didn't have a new album out yet. They have since made peace and became good friends

2011
In February 2011 Dineo had a breakdown on air and was subsequently taken off air resulting in her content producer Bujy and co-host Linda Mbuso to stand in for her.

During the afternoon drive show she started sobbing uncontrollably two hours before her show ended, when questioned about this by management, Dineo said she couldn't take it anymore. Sunday World states that she was crying because she had had a fight with YFM marketing manager Tamaria Motsepe , who had allegedly denied her the chance to attend this year's J&B Met in Cape Town.
Motsepe told the paper that Dineo was facing a disciplinary hearing, headed by station manager Tumelo Diaho-Monaheng.

J&B Met
During the J&B Met weekend in February it was reported that she had lost it and that she went into a tirade on a bus, where she allegedly swore at Brenda Ngxoli and Palesa Mocuminyane. She than reportedly told Ngxoli and Mocuminyane off when they reprimanded her for complaining that Kenny Kunene took her friend and colleague Faith Mangope to Mzoli's Buy and Braai Butchery in Gugulethu. It is believed that "Dineo was shouting and screaming, asking how Kenny can go to Mzoli's Buy and Braai Butchery in Gugulethu with her colleague and friend (Faith),".

A witness states that Mocuminyane jokingly said: "Give another child a chance to enjoy him."
"Dineo started screaming that she was going to teach both Mangope and Kunene a lesson, while crying and swearing,",Dineo has since apologized for confrontation.

Hypothyroidism
Dineo reportedly spent three days in the Life Fourways Hospital after she was admitted for a brain-related chronic illness caused by stress and hypertension. On Thursday 24 February 2011 Dineo was admitted and discharged after two days of treatment following her being diagnosed with hypothyroidism a brain shrinkage and temporal lobe epilepsy.  It is reported that she was never in rehab, she was in the Life Fourways hospital. Dineo states that she was diagnosed with hypothyroidism in 2004, and that her condition was under control until the J&B Met. She has since became an advocate for Mental Health.

References

External links

 Yfm Page

South African DJs
South African radio presenters
South African women radio presenters
South African television presenters
South African women television presenters
Living people
1983 births
Electronic dance music DJs